Northern Alps may be:
the Alps north of the Periadriatic Seam
the Alps north of the Main chain of the Alps
Northern Limestone Alps
Hida Mountains, Japan